The 60th British Academy Film Awards, given by the British Academy of Film and Television Arts, took place on 11 February 2007 and honoured the best films of 2006.

The Queen won Best Film and Best Actress for Helen Mirren. Paul Greengrass won Best Director for United 93, which also won Best Editing. Forest Whitaker won Best Actor for The Last King of Scotland, which also won Outstanding British Film and Best Adapted Screenplay. The ceremony also featured the inaugural BAFTA Award for Best Animated Film, which was awarded to Happy Feet, directed by George Miller.

Winners and nominees

Statistics

In Memoriam

Jack Wild
Johnny Sekka
Teddy Joseph
Derek Bond
Philippe Noiret
Henry Bumstead
Shohei Imamura
Alida Valli
Garth Thomas
Gordon Parks
Carlo Ponti
Glenn Ford
Jack Palance
Patrick Allen
Peter Benchley
June Allyson
Sven Nykvist
William Franklyn
Val Guest
Malcolm Arnold
Kenneth Griffith
Maureen Stapleton
Peter Boyle
Mitzi Cunliffe
Robert Altman

See also
 79th Academy Awards
 32nd César Awards
 12th Critics' Choice Awards
 59th Directors Guild of America Awards
 20th European Film Awards
 64th Golden Globe Awards
 27th Golden Raspberry Awards
 21st Goya Awards
 22nd Independent Spirit Awards
 12th Lumières Awards
 18th Producers Guild of America Awards
 11th Satellite Awards
 33rd Saturn Awards
 13th Screen Actors Guild Awards
 59th Writers Guild of America Awards

External links
 This year's nominees 

Film060
B
2007 in British cinema
February 2007 events in the United Kingdom
2007 in London
2006 awards in the United Kingdom